George A. Ellsworth (1843–1899), commonly known as "Lightning" Ellsworth, was a Canadian telegrapher who served in the cavalry forces of Brig. Gen. John Hunt Morgan in the Confederate Army during the American Civil War. His use of the telegraph to spread disinformation to the Union forces was declared by The Times as the greatest innovation to come out of the war.

Biography
Born in Upper Canada, Ellsworth was fascinated by the telegraph as soon as it was invented. As a teenager, he travelled to Washington, D.C., to study in Samuel Morse's telegraphy school. He then began working in Lexington, Kentucky, where he became friends with John Hunt Morgan. In 1860, Ellsworth moved to Houston, Texas.

Civil War
When the Civil War began in the following year, Morgan conceived the idea of using the telegraph to send disinformation to the enemy. Realizing that Ellsworth was perfect for the job, he asked him to join him. Ellsworth accepted and enlisted in Morgan's 2nd Kentucky Cavalry Regiment at Chattanooga, Tennessee.

Ellsworth excelled as a telegrapher. Not only could he read extremely fast code messages, but he also could imitate the sending style of other telegraphers (each of whom was slightly different), and he quickly mastered the "fist" of the Union Army's telegraphers in Kentucky and Tennessee. He gained his nickname "Lightning" during Morgan's first Kentucky Raid, when he sat on a railroad cross tie in knee deep water near Horse Cave, Kentucky, calmly tapping away at his telegraph key during a thunderstorm.

Ellsworth accompanied Morgan on his unauthorized great raid into Indiana and Ohio in 1863, but he escaped capture by swimming across the Ohio River with his portable telegraph, hanging on to a mule, at the Battle of Buffington Island. After Morgan made his escape from a Yankee prison, Ellsworth accompanied him on his last Kentucky Raid in 1864. Morgan was killed, and Ellsworth himself was captured at Cynthiana, Kentucky, but he soon managed to escape and made his way to Canada. Confederate secret agent Thomas Hines met him there, and he enlisted Ellsworth's help in an unsuccessful attempt to free Confederate POWs in the North.

Post-war
After the war, Ellsworth is said to have worked for Thomas Edison in Cincinnati, Ohio, but his last years are unknown. Edison claimed that Ellsworth found an ordinary telegraph office lacked any adventure and resigned. According to Edison, Lightning Ellsworth died in the Texas Panhandle, after he had become a "bad gun man". However, George A. Ellsworth appears in the 1880 U.S. Census as a telegrapher living in Kirkwood, St. Louis Co., Missouri. He was unmarried and told the census taker that his father had been born in New York and his mother in Connecticut. This census record makes Edison's Texas gunman story seem most unlikely.

References

American Civil War spies
Canadian expatriates in the United States
People of Kentucky in the American Civil War
1843 births
1899 deaths